New York primary, 2016 may refer to:
New York Democratic primary, 2016
New York Republican primary, 2016